Torrey Pines State Natural Reserve is  of coastal state park located in the community of La Jolla, in San Diego, California, off North Torrey Pines Road. Although it is located within San Diego city limits, it remains one of the wildest stretches of land (8 km²) on the Southern California coast. It is bordered immediately on the south by Torrey Pines Municipal Golf Course and on the north by the city of Del Mar. The reserve was designated a National Natural Landmark in 1977.

The reserve consists of a plateau with cliffs that overlook Torrey Pines State Beach, and a lagoon that is vital to migrating seabirds. Many different kinds of wildlife and flora are found within the reserve, including bobcat, fox, skunk, raccoon, coyote, rabbit, cacti, coastal chaparral, and the rare Torrey pine. During Whale migration, it is sometimes possible to see several species of whale from the cliffs, including humpback whale and gray whale. The  of trails within the park offer an attraction for hikers and beach-goers and a small museum sits at the top of the hill. From the cliffs or many places along the beach, it is possible to see La Jolla to the south and Del Mar to the north. At the southern end of the beach is a large rock that projects into the ocean, called Flat Rock. South of the rock is San Diego's unofficial nude beach, Black's Beach.

Establishment
The area was once home to the Kumeyaay people. George Marston persuaded the San Diego City Council in 1899 to pass an ordinance preserving  of the pueblo land as a park. Later between 1908 and 1911, newspaperwoman and philanthropist Ellen Browning Scripps bought additional land and donated it to the city. In 1916, Guy Fleming visited the park and after examining the current condition, pushed for preservation of the park and eventually became the District Superintendent for the Southern California State Park System. The Torrey Pines Lodge was completed in 1923 and a year later, more lands were added to the park.

In 1956, it was decided that the park be handed over to the State of California for higher protection because it is a state reserve. In 1970,  and 1,500 trees were added due to fear of human expansion. Later in 1975, the Torrey Pines Docent Society was started to help promote preservation of the park, in addition to the Visitors Center. In 2007, the park's name was changed to Torrey Pines State Natural Reserve. The official Torrey Pines website provides more detail on the establishment of the Torrey Pines Reserve.

Ecology

Torrey Pine
The Pinus torreyana torreyana, also known as the Torrey pine, is the rarest pine in North America. The plant has vanished over time due to the drying period over the last 10 years and has an intricate root system that helps attach it to the overbearing bluffs. Torrey Pines is the sole location worldwide where this subspecies grows (including a small coastal strip immediately north of the Reserve in Del Mar. A closely related subspecies occurs on Santa Rosa Island.

Other species, climate 
While chiefly known as habitat to this extremely rare and endangered species, the Torrey Pine Reserve also is home to a wide variety of vegetation and wildlife. The Torrey Pines Reserve has a rather unusual climate due to the Santa Ana winds causing the vegetation to be drier. Plants such as Coastal sage scrub, Coastal Strand, and Salt marsh also thrive at Torrey Pines. More information on the different plants that grow at this park is provided on the official Torrey Pines website.

Trails
The Torrey Pines State Natural Reserve offers 8 trails to hikers that vary in terms of length, difficulty, and scenery. San Diego Tourism Authority says that three popular trails at the park are Guy Fleming Trail, Razor Point Trail, and Beach Trail. The trail provides diverse scenery from Peñasquitos Marsh to views of La Jolla and is well known for whale sightings in the winter. The Razor Point Trail is a  loop that provides hikers with a view of ravines and badlands while overlooking the ocean. The Beach Trail is a  walk that leads one down to the Torrey Pines State Beach. Although it is the least scenic trail, it is very popular due to taking hikers straight to the wide-open beach. Other trails at the park are the Parry Grove Trail, Yucca Point Trail, High Point Trail, Broken Hill Trail, and Discovery Trail. The official Torrey Pines website provides more information on the other trails.

Accidents
In 2008, a 57-year-old tourist from Henderson, Nevada died from a cliff that gave way. The man was struck on the head by basketball-sized boulders, and after the victim was dug out of the debris, a crew performed cardiopulmonary resuscitation to try to save his life. The man died hours later. Torrey Pines is known for its sandy, unstable cliffs and this was not the first time a cliff had collapsed. On January 18, 2014, a 65-year-old hiker fell about  down a trail at Torrey Pines and broke his ankle. The injury was so drastic that the man needed a cliff rescue.

Gallery

See also

 Los Peñasquitos Lagoon
 San Diego Historical Landmarks in La Jolla

References
Notes

Bibliography
 Torrey Pines State Reserve (2008) Torrey Pines State Reserve
 Hogan, C. Michael (2008) Torrey Pine: Pinus torreyana, Globaltwitcher, ed. Nicklas Stromberg

External links

 Official website
 Torrey Pines Association
 Torrey Pines SR California State Park

California State Reserves
Parks in San Diego
Protected areas of San Diego County, California
National Natural Landmarks in California
Nature reserves in California
La Jolla, San Diego
Landmarks in San Diego
1977 establishments in California